The Secretariat of Agriculture and Rural Development (SADER) is Mexico's agriculture ministry. The current secretary under President Andrés Manuel López Obrador (AMLO), starting December 1, 2018, is Víctor Villalobos.

History

The secretariat traces its roots to 1917, when it was established as the Secretaría de Agricultura y Fomento (Secretariat of Agriculture and Development). The name changed in 1946 to Secretaría de Agricultura y Ganadería (Secretariat of Agriculture and Ranching), in 1976 to Secretaría de Agricultura y Recursos Hidráulicos (Secretariat of Agriculture and Hydraulic Resources), and again in 1994 to Secretaría de Agricultura, Ganadería y Desarrollo Rural (Secretariat of Agriculture, Ranching and Rural Development).

In 2000, the name changed to the Secretariat of Agriculture, Livestock, Rural Development, Fisheries and Food (SAGARPA).

In December 2018, after the inauguration of Andrés Manuel López Obrador as president, SAGARPA became SADER.

Leadership 

During the presidency of Enrique Peña Nieto, Enrique Martínez y Martínez served as the initial secretary. He left the post in 2015 to become Mexico's ambassador to Cuba and was replaced by José Eduardo Calzada Rovirosa, the former Governor of Querétaro. Baltazar Hinojosa Ochoa finished out the Peña Nieto sexenio as the head of SAGARPA.

Alberto Cárdenas Jiménez (2006–2009) and Francisco Javier Mayorga Castañeda (2009–2012) were the Agriculture Secretaries under Felipe Calderón. Mayorga Castañeda was also Agriculture Secretary during the administration of Vicente Fox.

Previous designations 
Since its creation, the current Secretariat of Agriculture and Rural Development has had the following names:

 (1842–1917): General Directorate of Industry
 (1917–1946): Ministry of Agriculture and Development
 (1946–1976): Secretariat of Agriculture and Livestock (SAG).
 (1976–1994): Secretariat of Agriculture and Hydraulic Resources (SARH).
 (1994–2000): Secretariat of Agriculture, Livestock and Rural Development (SAGAR).
 (2000–2018): Secretariat of Agriculture, Livestock, Rural Development, Fisheries and Food (SAGARPA).

List of Secretaries of Agriculture of Mexico

Ministry of Agriculture and Development 
 Government of Venustiano Carranza (1917–1920)
 (1917–1920): Pastor Rouaix

 Government of Adolfo de la Huerta (1920)
 (1920): Antonio I. Villarreal

 Government of Álvaro Obregón (1920–1924)
 (1920–1924): Antonio I. Villarreal
 (1924): Ramón P. de Negri

 Government of Plutarco Elías Calles (1924–1928)
 (1924–1928): Luis L. León

 Government of Emilio Portes Gil (1928–1930)
 (1928–1930): Marte R. Gómez

 Government of Pascual Ortiz Rubio (1930–1932)
 (1930–1931): Manuel Pérez Treviño
 (1931): Saturnino Cedillo
 (1931–1932): Francisco S. Elías

 Government of Abelardo L. Rodríguez (1932–1934)
 (1932–1934): Francisco S. Elías

 Government of Lázaro Cárdenas del Río (1934–1940)
 (1934–1935): Tomás Garrido Canabal
 (1935–1937): Saturnino Cedillo
 (1937–1940): José E. Parrés

 Government of Manuel Ávila Camacho (1940–1946)
 (1940–1946): Marte R. Gómez

Secretariat of Agriculture and Livestock 
 Government of Miguel Alemán Valdés (1946–1952)
 (1946–1952): Nazario S. Ortiz Garza

 Government of Adolfo Ruiz Cortines (1952–1958)
 (1952–1958): Gilberto Flores Muñoz

 Government of Adolfo López Mateos (1958–1964)
 (1958–1964): Julián Rodríguez Adame

 Government of Gustavo Díaz Ordaz (1964–1970)
 (1964–1970): Juan Gil Preciado
 (1970): Manuel Bernardo Aguirre

 Government of Luis Echeverría (1970–1976)
 (1970–1974): Manuel Bernardo Aguirre
 (1974–1976): Óscar Brauer Herrera

Secretariat of Agriculture and Hydraulic Resources 
 Government of José López Portillo (1976–1982)
 (1976–1982): Francisco Merino Rábago

 Government of Miguel de la Madrid (1982–1988)
 (1982–1984): Horacio García Aguilar
 (1984–1988): Eduardo Pesqueira Olea

 Government of Carlos Salinas de Gortari (1988–1994)
 (1988–1990): Jorge de la Vega Domínguez
 (1990–1994): Carlos Hank González

Secretariat of Agriculture, Livestock and Rural Development 
 Government of Ernesto Zedillo (1994–2000)
 (1994–1995): Arturo Warman Gryj
 (1995–1998): Francisco Labastida Ochoa
 (1998–2000): Romárico Arroyo Marroquín

Secretariat of Agriculture, Livestock, Rural Development, Fisheries and Food 
 Government of Vicente Fox (2000–2006)
 (2000–2005): Javier Usabiaga Arroyo
 (2005–2006): Francisco Mayorga Castañeda

 Government of Felipe Calderón Hinojosa (2006–2012)
 (2006–2009): Alberto Cárdenas Jiménez
 (2009–2012): Francisco Mayorga Castañeda

 Government of Enrique Peña Nieto (2012–2018)
 (2012–2015): Enrique Martínez and Martínez
 (2015–2018): José Calzada Rovirosa
 (2018): Baltazar Hinojosa Ochoa

Secretatiat of Agruculture and Rural Delevopment 
 Government of Andres Manuel López Obrador (2018–present)
 (2018–present): Victor Villalobos Arámbula

Programs 

 Plant Health (Sanidad Vegetal) – Prevention, surveillance, control, and eradication of plant pests.

References

External links

Cabinet of Mexico
Mexico
Phytosanitary authorities
Agricultural organizations based in Mexico
1842 establishments in Mexico
Ministries established in 1842
Agriculture